Melillan People's Union (UPM) was a Spanish political party based in Melilla. It existed between 1985 and 2003, when it merged into the nationwide People's Party (PP).

References

1985 establishments in Spain
2003 disestablishments in Spain
Political parties established in 1985
Political parties disestablished in 2003
Political parties in Melilla
Conservative parties in Spain